Velasco Glacier is a glacier about 5 nautical miles (9 km) long flowing west from Walgreen Coast toward the Backer Islands. It was named by the Advisory Committee on Antarctic Names (US-ACAN) after Miguel G. Velasco, a United States Geological Survey (USGS) computer specialist, and part of the USGS team that compiled the Advanced Very High Resolution Radiometer 1:5,000,000-scale maps of Antarctica in the 1990s.

See also
 List of glaciers in the Antarctic
 Glaciology

References
 

Glaciers of Ellsworth Land